For other places with the same name, see Wazirabad (disambiguation)

Dariba Kalan (Hindi: दरीबा कलान, English: Street of the Incomparable Pearl), is a 17th-century street in Chandni Chowk area of Old Delhi or Shahjahanbad. It lies within the walled city of Delhi, and connects the Chandni Chowk area with Jama Masjid. The words Khurd and Kalan, "small" and "big" in Persian, respectively, are used to distinguish  two villages that have the same name.

History
It derives its name from the Persian Dur-e be-baha, which translates as "unparalleled pearl", while suffix Kalan means big. There was also a smaller street near by, known as Dariba Khurd or Chhota Dariba, both Khurd and Chhota meaning "small"; it is now known as Kinari Bazaar. This is in reference to its history as a popular market for precious stones and gold and silver jewelry, especially under the reign of the 17th-century Mughal emperor Shah Jahan. The street witnessed the bloody massacre of Delhi in March 1739, ordered by the Persian invader Nadir Shah, when hundreds of innocent civilians and soldiers were killed and the gold shops were looted.

Overview
Today, most of the shops in Dariba Kalan trade in costume jewellery. Some also deal in authentic ittar, a special variety of perfume. These stores claim to date back to the early 19th century. Also near by is Kinari Bazaar, Gali Kazanchi, and Gali Paranthe Wali, also at both ends of the street are famous jalebi shops.

In popular culture
Dariba Kalan is mentioned in the popular song Kajra Re from the hit Hindi film Bunty aur Babli (2005)

See also
 Nadir Shah
 Jainism in Delhi

References 

Streets in Delhi
Retail markets in Delhi
History of Delhi
Jewellery districts
Neighbourhoods in Delhi
Shopping districts and streets in India

bn:দারিবা
bpy:দারিবা
new:दरिबा
vi:Dariba